Mr. Natwarlal is a 1979 Indian Hindi action comedy film produced by Tony Glaad (as "Tony") and directed by Rakesh Kumar. The film stars Amitabh Bachchan, Rekha, Ajit, Kader Khan, Amjad Khan and the music is by Rajesh Roshan, the songs are written by Anand Bakshi. The highlight of the film was a children's song sung by Amitabh Bachchan. Tony Glaad decided to take them as the writers of the film. The film was shot in Kashmir with most of the shooting done in Beerwah, Jammu and Kashmir

The name of the film and lead character were inspired by a notorious Indian conman, Natwarlal.

Getting Amitabh to sing was a gimmick that was tried for the first time in this movie. Kabhi Kabhi earlier had Amitabh use spoken verse within a melodic song, but this was the first time he sang in a movie. This was subsequently copied by other filmmakers in films like Laawaris, Silsila and Pukar.

As per a trade guide, which was premium box-office publication in the 1970s and 1980s, Mr. Natwarlal was a "Super Hit". In today's lenient classification system, Mr. Natwarlal is easily a blockbuster.

Plot
Natwar is a young boy, when his beloved older brother and caretaker, police officer Girdharilal, is framed for bribery by sinister criminal mastermind Vikram. When he grows up, Natwar creates a secret identity for himself, posing as a powerful and mysterious underworld figure named Mr. Natwarlal, determined to slowly but surely exact vengeance on Vikram. Girdharilal does not understand his motives and develops a grudge against him.
Natwar learns from Mickey, an infamous underworld figure and Vikram's former ally, who is posing as a burnt man, that Vikram is in a village called Chandanpur and wants a diamond necklace, which is in the possession of Fakirchand, one of Mickey's allies. Natwar steals the necklace, unknown to everyone present there and leaves for Chandanpur, after apologising to an asleep Girdharilal about the troubles he has given to him. Meanwhile, it is revealed that Mickey also wants to exact revenge on Vikram for betraying him. He reveals that Vikram is terrorising the villagers using a tiger. Natwar arrives at Chandanpur, disguised as Avtaar Singh, a hunter whom Vikram had already killed, unknown to everyone.

Cast

 Amitabh Bachchan as Natwarlal
 Rekha as Shanno
 Ajit as Inspector Girdharilal
Indrani Mukherjee
 Kader Khan as Mukhiya / Baba
 Amjad Khan as Vikram Singh
 Satyen Kappu as Mickey
 Yunus Parvez
 Gurbachan Singh

Awards 

 27th Filmfare Awards:

Nominated

 Best Actor – Amitabh Bachchan
 Best Music Director – Rajesh Roshan
 Best Male Playback Singer – Amitabh Bachchan for "Mere Paas Aao"

Soundtrack
The music was composed by Rajesh Roshan and the lyrics were penned by Anand Bakshi.
Rajesh Roshan was nominated for Best Music Director award for the film; Laxmikant-Pyarelal received the award for Sargam that year.

The song "Pardesia" by Kishore Kumar and Lata Mangeshkar, of this movie was popular, besides "Oonchi Oonchi Baaton Se" by Mohammed Rafi and Usha Mangeshkar.

Amitabh Bachchan has a solo number on his own; "Mere Paas Aao Mere Doston". This song was the first song sung by Amitabh Bachchan in Bollywood.

References

External links 
 
 

1979 films
1970s Hindi-language films
Films scored by Rajesh Roshan
Indian action comedy films
Films about con artists